Stranded on Earth is an album by Valient Thorr, released in 2003.

Track listing 
 "One Tuff Customer"
 "Bigger Badder"
 "Radiation"
 "Time Zone"
 "The Apprentice"
 "Don’t Stop"
 "Stuck"
 "Running The Gauntlet"
 "Swallows Of Love"
 "Walk On Wine"
 "Stranded On Earth"
 "Ballad of the Morning Star"

2003 albums
Valient Thorr albums